In topology a branch of mathematics, a quasi-open map or quasi-interior map is a function which has similar properties to continuous maps. 
However, continuous maps and quasi-open maps are not related.

Definition 

Properties 

Let  be a map between topological spaces.
 If  is continuous, it need not be quasi-open.  Conversely if  is quasi-open, it need not be continuous.
 If  is open, then  is quasi-open.
 If  is a local homeomorphism, then  is quasi-open.
 The composition of two quasi-open maps is again quasi-open.

See also

Notes

References 

Topology